The United States Army Special Forces are the foundational branch of the larger elite special operations forces.

Army Special Forces may also refer to:

 Army of the Republic of Vietnam Special Forces, the elite military units of the Army of the Republic of Vietnam
 French Army Special Forces Brigade, the French Army's special forces unit
 People's Liberation Army Special Operations Forces, the sub-branch of the Chinese People's Liberation Army Ground Force that specialises in rapid reaction combat
 Sri Lanka Army Special Forces Regiment, the elite special forces unit of the Sri Lanka Army